The bilbo is a type of 16th century, cut-and-thrust sword or small rapier formerly popular in America. 
They have well-tempered and flexible blades and were very popular aboard ships, where they were used similarly to a cutlass. The term comes from the Basque city of Bilbao, Bilbo in Basque, where the metal (bilbo steel) was extracted and later sent to Toledo, a city in the center of the Iberian peninsula, where these swords were forged and exported to the New World. These swords were also sold to merchants of every European nation, including England.

Etymology
Bilbo (Basque: Labana Bizkaitarra, Spanish: daga vizcaína (Biscayne dagger)) is an English catch-all word used to very generally refer to the "utilitarian" cup-hilt swords, found all over America. They usually had a wide, relatively short sturdy and well-tempered blade, were comparatively unadorned, and were considered practical and utilitarian. The grip was often covered with wire, rather than plain nut.

References

See also

Dirk
Falchion
Cutlass

Modern European swords
Bilbao